The Coalition to Diversify Computing (CDC) is a joint organization of the Association for Computing Machinery (ACM) and the Computing Research Association (CRA). CDC emphasizes recruiting minority undergraduates to MS/PhD programs, retaining minority graduate students enrolled in MS/PhD programs, and transitioning minority MS/PhD graduates into academia, industry, and government careers.

See also

 Association for Computing Machinery
 Diversity in computing

References

External links
 Official website

Information technology organizations based in North America
Computer science education
Professional associations based in the United States
Diversity in computing